The Lakeland Correctional Facility is a state prison for men located in Coldwater, Branch County, Michigan, owned and operated by the Michigan Department of Corrections.  

The facility was opened in 1985 and has a working capacity of 1500 prisoners held at a medium security level.

Notable detainees
 Lawrence DeLisle - convicted of the Murder of the DeLisle children
Jerald Leroy Wingeart - murderer of Dawn Magyar, at the time of conviction in November 2001, the longest unsolved murder case in the history of Michigan at 28 years.
Larry Ranes - serial killer who was sentenced to life without parole.
Lowell Amos - convicted murderer and suspected serial killer, died in prison in 2022.

See also
Impact of the COVID-19 pandemic on prisons

References

Prisons in Michigan
Buildings and structures in Branch County, Michigan
1985 establishments in Michigan
Coldwater, Michigan